The Red Bulletin is a lifestyle magazine published by Red Bull Media House that began in 2005. The Red Bulletin features sports, culture, music, nightlife, entrepreneurship and lifestyle stories.

Target Group
The Red Bulletin is a general interest magazine for men between the ages of 25 and 35.

Editorial concept 
The men’s active lifestyle magazine is a monthly magazine published by Red Bull Media House Publishing GmbH, whose headquarters are in Vienna, Austria. Editorial content is controlled and designed from Vienna in close collaboration with local editors. The Red Bulletin offers a wide range of global content, while also featuring national interests.

History 
 2005: The Red Bulletin was first published at the Monaco Grand Prix, printed onsite. From this point on, the magazine became an integral part of the Formula One season; initially, it started as a daily newspaper on-site.
 2007: From November, The Red Bulletin became a monthly magazine, first appearing on a regular basis in Austria.
 2009: The Red Bulletin was launched in the UK, Germany and Ireland.
 2010: The Red Bulletin was established in New Zealand, South Africa and Kuwait.
 2011: Publication began in the USA, Switzerland, France and Mexico. In the same year, The Red Bulletin app was launched.
 2013: From May onwards, an e-paper version for Brazil was available. In addition, the Kuwait version became a "Gulf Edition", thereby addressing other Middle East countries. For the first time all national issues also became available as a digital e-paper.
 2014: In June, to coincide with the return of Formula One in Austria, The Red Bulletin went back to its roots – a daily special edition was released for the Grand Prix weekend in Spielberg. Also in this year, The Red Bulletin entered the Asian Market with a South Korean and a Chinese special edition.
 2015: From November The Red Bulletin became permanently available in a broader market with a monthly South Korean Edition. At the same time, the launch of The Red Bulletin New Zealand was stopped.
 2016: Reaching out to a business-oriented as well as the start-up scene, The Red Bulletin launched its first two line extension issues -  The Red Bulletin Innovator - in May and October. Towards the end of the year, The Red Bulletin Ireland and The Red Bulletin South Korea were taken off the market.

Circulation & Distribution

With a monthly print run of more than 1.4 million copies, available in four languages (German, English, French) and own local country editions in 6 markets (Austria, Germany, Switzerland, France, United Kingdom, the USA), The Red Bulletin is one of the most widely circulated international monthly magazines. The distribution of the magazine is organized through national and international channels, distributed with renowned carrier partners, as well as available on the newsstand and as a subscription worldwide.

References 

2007 establishments in Austria
Magazines established in 2007
Magazines published in Vienna
Men's magazines
Monthly magazines published in Austria
Multilingual magazines
Red Bull